The Little Muddy River is a tributary of the Missouri River, approximately  long, in northwestern North Dakota in the United States.

It rises in the prairie country of northern Williams County and flows west, then south, joining the Missouri near Williston.

See also
List of North Dakota rivers

References

Rivers of North Dakota
Tributaries of the Missouri River
Bodies of water of Williams County, North Dakota